The Elements of King Crimson is a box set series by King Crimson. Originally created to promote the band's 2014 tour of the same name, it is sold exclusively through the band's merchandise booth on the tour and from the Discipline Global Mobile online stores.

The first box's content was less focused on actual songs and more on song "elements"; extracts of studio recordings, alternate takes, mixes with one or two instruments isolated, live recordings and rehearsals; the tour box was the first CD release for most of the tracks included. Some of them had already been released for digital download through the DGM Live website while some others are set to be included in future DGM releases; it also came with a 24-page booklet. The box marked the first time both studio and live recorded material with Gavin Harrison was released on CD, the first time material with Jakko Jakszyk was released under the King Crimson name, and the first time material with Bill Rieflin was released overall. Besides the version offered by DGM, the box was released, bundled with two tour badges, in Japan by WOWOW Entertainment.

For the 2015 legs of the tour, a second volume was issued; online distribution of it started on 10 September 2015. Further volumes followed in 2016, 2017, 2018, 2019 and with an issue in 2020 although without being for a tour.

2014 Tour Box track listing

Track 1 is an extract from a version released in 2009 as part of the "40th Anniversary Series" re-issue and box set of In the Court of the Crimson King.
Track 3 was first released in 2011 as part of the "40th Anniversary Series" re-issue of In the Wake of Poseidon.
Tracks 4 & 12 were first released in 2011 as part of "DGM Live Hot Tickles" podcast, now available on the DGM Live site for download as part of Mr Stormy's Monday Selection Vol.4.
Track 5 was first released in 2012 on the DGM Live site for download with the rest of the show it was taken from. It's set to be included in the forthcoming The Collectable King Crimson Vol. 7.
Tracks 6 & 9 have never been released before this tour box.
Track 7 was first released in 2013 as part of "DGM Live Hot Tickles" podcast, now available on the DGM Live site for download as part of Mr Stormy's Monday Selection Vol. 7.
Track 8's mix was first released in 2012 as part of the "40th Anniversary Series" reissue of Larks' Tongues in Aspic.
Track 10 is an extract from a version released in 2012 as part of the "40th Anniversary Series" reissue of Larks' Tongues in Aspic.
Track 11 was also released as part of the live album The Night Watch. The mix used in the tour box is set to be included in the forthcoming Starless box set.
Track 14 was released on the 2005 & 2013 editions of the USA album and was also released as part of the box set The Road to Red and on the DGM site for download with the rest of the USA source material, mostly from a different show in Asbury Park, New Jersey. 
Track 15 was first released in 2012 as part of "DGM Live Hot Tickles" podcast, now available on the DGM Live site for download as part of Mr Stormy's Monday Selection Vol.5.

Tracks 2, 8, 10, 12 & 13 have never been released before this tour box.
Track 3 is set to be included in the forthcoming 40th anniversary CD/DVD-A reissue of Beat.
Track 4 was first released in 2012 as part of "DGM Live Hot Tickles" podcast, now available on the DGM Live site for download as part of Mr Stormy's Monday Selection Vol.5.
Track 5 is set to be included in the forthcoming 40th anniversary CD/DVD-A reissue of Three of a Perfect Pair.
Track 6 is set to be included in the forthcoming THRAKBOXX.
Track 7 was first released in 2006 on the DGM Live site for download with the rest of the show it was taken from.
Track 9 was also released as part of the box set The ProjeKcts and on the DGM site for download with the rest of the show it was taken from.
Track 11 was first released in 2008 on the DGM Live site for download with the rest of the show it was taken from.

2015 Tour Box track listing

2016 Tour Box track listing

2017 Tour Box track listing

2018 Tour Box track listing

2019 Tour Box track listing

2020 Tour Box track listing

2021 Tour Box track listing

Personnel 
Robert Fripp – Guitars, Keyboards, Soundscapes
Michael Giles, Andy McCulloch, Ian Wallace, Bill Bruford, Jamie Muir, Pat Mastelotto, Gavin Harrison, Bill Rieflin, Jeremy Stacey – Drums, Percussion
Ian McDonald, Mel Collins– Woodwinds, Keyboards, Backing Vocals
Greg Lake, Boz Burrell, John Wetton – Vocals, Bass
Peter Sinfield, Richard Palmer-James – Lyrics
Peter Giles – Bass
Keith Tippet – Acoustic and Electric Pianos
David Cross – Violin
Mark Charig – Cornet
Tony Levin – Bass, Chapman Stick, Backing Vocals
Adrian Belew, Jakko Jakszyk – Guitar, Vocals, Lyrics
Trey Gunn – Chapman Stick, Warr Guitar

2014 compilation albums
King Crimson compilation albums
King Crimson live albums
Albums produced by Robert Fripp
Discipline Global Mobile albums